The Orwood Tract is an island in the Sacramento–San Joaquin River Delta. It is part of Contra Costa County, California. It, along with Palm Tract to the north, are managed by Reclamation District 2024 (Orwood and Palm Tracts). It appears on 1913 and 1952 United States Geological Survey maps of the area.

References

Islands of Contra Costa County, California
Islands of the Sacramento–San Joaquin River Delta
Islands of Northern California